Travis Walton may refer to:

 Travis Walton (basketball) (born 1987), American professional basketball player and coach
 Travis Walton UFO incident, 1975 incident in which an American logger claimed to have been abducted by a UFO